Brett Goldspink is an Australian rugby league player who played professionally in England and Australia.

Playing career
Goldspink played for Illawarra, South Sydney and Western Reds in Australia between 1992 and 1996.

Goldspink played for Souths in their upset 1994 Tooheys Challenge Cup final victory over Brisbane. He was part of the Reds inaugural side on 12 March 1995.

He then moved to England and played for the Oldham Bears (Heritage № 1049), St. Helens (Heritage № 1082), Wigan Warriors (Heritage № 922) and Halifax between 1997 and 2002.

References

External links
Saints Heritage Society profile

1971 births
Living people
Australian rugby league players
Halifax R.L.F.C. players
Illawarra Steelers players
Oldham R.L.F.C. players
Place of birth missing (living people)
Rugby league props
South Sydney Rabbitohs players
St Helens R.F.C. players
Western Reds players
Wigan Warriors players